Foxes Cross Bottom is a   Local Nature Reserve north-west of Whitstable in Kent. It is owned and managed by Canterbury City Council.

This site has diverse habitats of grassland, scrub, broadleaved woodland, ponds, ditches and hedges. The meadows are grazed by ponies and highland cattle.

There is public access to the site.

References

Local Nature Reserves in Kent